This is a list of Estonian television related events from 1966.

Events

Debuts
 30 May - television series "Täna 25 aastat tagasi" started. The series was hosted by Valdo Pant.

Television shows

Ending this year

Births

Deaths

See also
 1966 in Estonia

References

1960s in Estonian television